Dryopteris affinis, the scaly male fern or golden-scaled male fern, is a fern native to western and southern Europe and southwestern Asia. It is most abundant on moist soils in woodlands in areas with high humidity, such as the British Isles and western France. In the Mediterranean region and the Caucasus it is confined to high altitudes.

Description
There is a blackish spot at the base of the pinna where it joins the rachis.

Individual fronds live for about 1.5 years and remain attached to the rhizome after withering. D. affinis is closely related to Dryopteris filix-mas, distinguished by its usually more robust habit with usually more evergreen fronds, more densely scaly frond stems, and more rectangular (less tapered and lobed) pinnae and pinnules.

Cultivation
Numerous cultivars and varieties have been selected for garden use, of which the following have gained the Royal Horticultural Society's Award of Garden Merit:
D. affinis 
'Polydactyla Mapplebeck' 
'Crispa Gracilis'
'Cristata' 
'Cristata Angustata'

References

External links

Flora Europaea: Dryopteris affinis
Hyde, H. A., Wade, A. E., & Harrison, S. G. (1978). Welsh Ferns. National Museum of Wales.

affinis
Ferns of Asia
Ferns of Europe
Flora of Iran
Flora of Western Asia
Flora of England
Flora of Norway
Taxa named by Richard Thomas Lowe